Frijj (stylised as FRijj) is a brand of milkshake sold mainly in the United Kingdom.  Today it is produced by Müller. It was first launched in 1993 by Dairy Crest. Frijj is sold in five permanent flavours: strawberry, chocolate, banana, fudge brownie and cookie dough. 

There have also been numerous limited edition flavours. Since July 2003, some have featured characters from The Simpsons, in marketing campaigns. Other limited edition flavours include custard, caramel, raspberry doughnut, Jaffa Cake, banoffee pie, vanilla, white chocolate, chocolate mint, cookies and cream and irish coffee. 

A thicker version of Frijj was launched in 1998 called 'Frijj Extreme', available in two flavours – white chocolate and milk chocolate. Since 27 December 2015, Frijj has been produced by Müller Milk & Ingredients following the sale by Dairy Crest of their milk business to Müller.

Sizes
Frijj is sold in 400ml and 900ml bottle sizes. 400ml bottles are in all flavours but 900ml bottles are only in strawberry and brownie flavour at the moment.

Flavours

Sponsorship and campaigns 
Frijj is well known for its high profile sponsorship campaigns, the most famous of which was the association with television show Big Brother, the sponsorship lasted for one series during 2003. Around the same time, Frijj was the main sponsor of ill fated dating show Elimidate hosted by ex Atomic Kitten singer Kerry Katona; the sponsorship of the show ceased at the end of its run in 2003.

In 1993, Frijj was advertised on television, with a series of stop-motion animation adverts made by 3 Peach Animation, which featured some bizarre cows. July 2008 marked the introduction of a new advertising campaign for Frijj, the first since 2005. This included a series of five viral videos produced by the advertising agency Grey London, which parodied 1950s horror film The Blob. Further to this, a number of adverts ran on the sides of buses and a limited edition bottle design was produced.

In August 2009, it was revealed that Frijj were going to be the new sponsors of Soccer AM, a weekly football based programme produced by British Sky Broadcasting, after signing a £2 million sponsorship deal. Frijj also sponsor Morden & District Sunday Football League team Epsom Downs FC.

The 2011 "circus" flavours each had their own animal mascot appearing on the packaging; Magnus Monkee (monkey), Pablo Pooch (dog), Hugo Meeow (tiger), The Great Lazaro (rabbit) and Captain Roary (lion), animals commonly found in traditional circuses, to fit in with that range's theme.

Thorpe Park offer
For a short period in 2012, Frijj sold their milkshakes at normal prices in supermarkets, but with an offer to win prizes, and to use the bottle as a free ticket to Thorpe Park. Those who bought the products in this time could enter a code on the bottle on the official Frijj website. The offer ended in the end of September 2012.

Criticism

Liverpool City Council started a campaign against sugary drinks in May 2016. The campaign entitled “Is your child’s sweet tooth harming their health?”, names Lucozade as the worst offender, with 62 grams of sugar in a 500ml bottle, followed by Coca-Cola. Frijj chocolate milkshake was the third most sugary drink identified with 50.8 grams in a 471ml bottle. Posters will be displayed in doctors' surgeries and hospitals.

References

External links
Official Website

Flavored milk